"Give" is a song by American country recording artist LeAnn Rimes, that was released as the third and final single from her album Lady & Gentlemen. The song is written by Connie Harrington, Sonya Isaacs and Jimmy Yeary.

Background
The single was officially released for digital download to iTunes stores and Amazon.com on June 14, 2011. The single was released to radio on July 18, 2011. A set of remixes was released by iTunes stores for digital download on October 11, 2011.

Critical reception
Jonathan Keefe of Slant Magazine gave a mixed review on the song stating that "Rimes delivers a lovely, subtle performance on "Give," but the song lacks the depth of insight that "What I Cannot Change," the standout track on Family, proved she's capable of writing." Randy Lewis of the Los Angeles Times claimed that song takes Rimes "back to the contemporary pop-country mainstream."

Music video
The music video for "Give" was released on Rimes' official YouTube on September 9, 2011. A shorter version of the song was released later on CMT.com. Both videos are directed by Nigel Dick.

Track listing
Digital Download
"Give" (Radio Edit) — 4:06

US/UK Digital Download - Remixes
"Give" (Cahill Radio Edit) — 3:45
"Give" (Mixin' Marc & Tony Svejda Radio Edit) — 3:35
"Give" (Almighty Radio Edit) — 3:48
"Give" (Cahill Club Mix) — 7:31
"Give" (Mixin' Marc & Tony Svejda Extended Mix) — 5:30
"Give" (Almighty Club Mix) — 6:49

UK Promo CD single
"Give" (Radio Edit) — 4:06
"Swingin'" — 3:02

UK Promo Maxi single
"Give" (Almighty Radio Edit) — 3:48
"Give" (Almighty Club Mix) — 6:49
"Give" (Almighty Dub) — 6:40
"Give" (Almighty Instrumental) — 6:39

US Promo CD single
"Give" (Radio Edit) — 4:06

Charts

References

External links
 Give - Music Video at YouTube

2011 singles
LeAnn Rimes songs
Curb Records singles
Country ballads
Songs written by Jimmy Yeary
Songs written by Sonya Isaacs
Songs written by Connie Harrington
Music videos directed by Nigel Dick
2011 songs